Mike Amato is an American music tour manager, best known for working with Slipknot, Arcade Fire, Green Day, KISS, Linkin Park, Mötley Crüe, System of a Down, Cinderella, AC/DC, Skid Row, Marilyn Manson, Soundgarden, Kid Rock, Daughtry, Daniel Powter, and Godsmack, among others. He also was the interim manager for Type O Negative while serving as their Tour Manager.

A friendship with Vince Neil Mötley Crüe helped Amato break into the business, and the band's manager Doc McGhee offered him a job.

Amato’s first on-the-road experience came in 1987 as assistant tour manager for Mötley Crüe followed by a five-year trek as their tour/road manager from 1989-94. From 1994-95 he was out with Type O Negative as their tour manager and accountant, and then with Skid Row in 1995 in the same capacity. His career stays current and active today.

Bands tour managed

 Mötley Crüe (1992-1994)
 Type O Negative (1999-2000)
 Marilyn Manson (2000-2001)
 Kid Rock (2001-2006)
 KISS (2010-)
 Skid Row (1998-)

SLIPKNOT, Jan 2019 - Apr 2020 (Interrupted by COVID-19 hiatus)

ARCADE FIRE, Jan 2018 - Sep 2018

GREEN DAY, Aug 2016 - Nov 2017

SLIPKNOT, Sep 2014 - Aug 2016

SOUNDGARDEN, Mar 2014 - Sep 2014

GREEN DAY, July 2012 - Mar 2014

DAUGHTRY, Mar 2012 – June 2012

SYSTEM OF A DOWN, Dec 2010 – Mar 2012

rage against the machine, L.A. Rising,  July 2011

Brian Setzer Orchestra, April 2011

NIGHT RANGER, Mar 2011

GODSMACK, Sept 2010 – Nov 10

CREED, May 2010 – Sept 10

TOOL, Tool Touring, Inc., Burbank, CA
Tour Accountant: May 2010 – July 10

KISS, Mar 2009 – Dec 09

DANIEL POWTER, Feb 2008, Nov – Dec 2008, Nov – Dec 2006

STAIND, Jan — Feb 2008

LINKIN PARK, July 2006 – Oct 08, Jan 2003 – Sep 04

ANDREW “DICE” CLAY, Tour Consultant: Dec 2006

ROB THOMAS, May – Jul 2006

KID ROCK, Jan – May 2006, Dec 2001 – Nov 02

SYSTEM OF A DOWN, Oct 2004 – Nov 05

MARILYN MANSON, Sep 2000 – Oct 01, May 1998 – Aug 99

CINDERELLA, Jun – Sep 2000, Jan – Apr 1998

TYPE O NEGATIVE, Jan 2000 – April 00, Sep – Dec 1999,

COAL CHAMBER, Jan 2000 – April 00, 1996 – 97, 1994 – 95

TYPE O NEGATIVE, Dec 1999 – April 2000, Nov 1996 – Mar 97

SKID ROW, 1995

MOTLEY CRUE, 1991 – 94, Assistant Tour Manager: 1987-91

AC/DC, 1991

 Linkin Park (2003-2006)

References

External links
 McGhee Entertainment

Living people
American music industry executives
Year of birth missing (living people)